The women's 100 metres sprint event at the 1960 Olympic Games took place between September 1 and September 2.

Results

Heats

The fastest four runners in each of the seven heats advanced to the quarterfinal round.

Heat 1

Heat 2

Heat 3

Heat 4

Heat 5

Heat 6

Heat 7

Quarterfinals

The fastest three runners in each of the four heats advanced to the semifinal round.

Quarterfinal 1

Quarterfinal 2

Quarterfinal 3

Quarterfinal 4

Semifinals

The fastest three runners in each of the two heats advanced to the final round.

Semifinal 1

Semifinal 2

Final

Wind = 2.8 m/s. Wind was over the allotted speed. All times in the finals were considered wind assisted and therefore were not counted toward world or Olympic records.

References

Athletics at the 1960 Summer Olympics
100 metres at the Olympics
1960 in women's athletics
Women's events at the 1960 Summer Olympics